Anerley is a coastal village in the South Coast of KwaZulu-Natal, South Africa.

The village is a holiday resort some 111 km south-west of Durban and 10 km north-east of Port Shepstone central and is said to be named after Anerley, a district in the south-east of London.

References

Populated places in the Ray Nkonyeni Local Municipality
KwaZulu-Natal South Coast